Monteaperti (or Montaperti) is a village in Tuscany, central Italy, administratively a frazione of the comune of Castelnuovo Berardenga, province of Siena. At the time of the 2001 census its population was 465. Monteaperti is about 12 km from Siena and 8 km from Castelnuovo Berardenga.

The place is known for being the scene of the battle of Montaperti (1260) between the Republic of Florence and the Republic of Siena.

The Romans built a very large (550 x 100 m) stadium (circus) here, visible in crop marks from the air.

References 

Frazioni of Castelnuovo Berardenga